Art Blakey et les Jazz-Messengers au club St. Germain are a set of live albums recorded on December 21, 1958, at the Club St. Germain in Paris, France by Art Blakey and the Jazz Messengers, released in three volumes by French RCA. All three albums have been collected on CD in the 2015 Sony box set, The Complete Columbia and RCA Albums Collection.

Track listing

Vol. 1
 "Politely" (Bill Hardman)
 "Whisper Not" (Benny Golson)
 "Now's the Time" (Charlie Parker)
 "The First Theme" (Traditional)

Vol. 2
 "Moanin' with Hazel" (Bobby Timmons)
 "(Evidence) We Named it Justice" (Thelonious Monk)
 "Blues March for Europe No. 1" (Benny Golson)
 "Like Someone in Love" (Johnny Burke, Jimmy Van Heusen)

Vol. 3
 "Along Came Manon" (Golson)
 "Out of the Past" (Golson)
 "A Night in Tunisia" (Dizzy Gillespie, Frank Paparelli)
 "Ending with the Theme" (Traditional)

Personnel 
Art Blakey - drums
Lee Morgan - trumpet
Benny Golson - tenor saxophone
Bobby Timmons - piano
Jymie Merritt  - bass
Kenny Clarke - drums on A Night in Tunisia only
Unknown - bongo on A Night in Tunisia only (thought to be Gana M'bow)

References 

1959 live albums
Art Blakey live albums
The Jazz Messengers live albums
RCA Records live albums